Tyrannophryne pugnax, the tyrant devil is a species of deep-sea anglerfish in the dreamer family, Oneirodidae. It is the sole member of its genus. Like other oneirodids, T. pugnax is a bathypelagic fish with a bioluminescent lure. It is known only from two adolescent female specimens, one caught in 1928 near Tahiti-Rarotonga, and the other in 1956 northwest of Bikini Atoll.

The most distinctive feature of T. pugnax is its extremely long lower jaw, the joint of which extends backwards well past the base of the pectoral fin. The body of the fish is relatively slender, naked, and entirely black in color. The tail fin has unpigmented rays and is covered by dark skin for some distance past its base. The sphenotic spines (above the eyes) and symphysial spine (at the tip of the jaw) are present.

Tyrannophryne pugnax can be found at around 2000 meters depth in the south pacific near the island of Tahiti.

References

Oneirodidae
Taxa named by Charles Tate Regan
Taxa named by Ethelwynn Trewavas
Fish described in 1932